Yashahkarna (IAST: Yaśaḥakarṇa, r. c. 1073-1123 CE) was a ruler of the Kalachuri dynasty of Tripuri in central India. His kingdom was centered around the Chedi or Dahala region in present-day Madhya Pradesh.

During Yashahkarna's reign, the Kalachuris lost the northern parts of their kingdom to the Gahadavalas, and also suffered defeats against the Paramaras and the Chandelas.

Reign 

Yashahkarna was a son of his predecessor Karna. His mother Avalladevi was a Huna princess.

Yashahkarna ascended the throne around 1073 CE, and soon raided the Andhra region. There, he is said to have worshipped at the Shiva temple in Draksharama. The contemporary ruler of the region was probably the Vengi Chalukya king Vijayaditya VII. Yashahkarna also raided Champaranya, which V. V. Mirashi identifies as Champaran in Bihar.

Yashahkarna lost the northern parts of his kingdom, including Varanasi, to the Gahadavalas. The Paramara king Lakshmadeva raided the Kalachuri Tripuri during his reign. The Chandela king Sallakshanavarman also defeated Yashahkarna.

Yashahkarna's rajaguru (royal preceptor) was Purusha-shiva.

References

Bibliography 

 
 

Kalachuris of Tripuri
11th-century Indian monarchs
12th-century Indian monarchs